Alexander Bagratovich Mirzoyan (born 20 April 1951) is a retired Soviet football player and coach of Armenian descent. Beginning in 1994, he has been the president of the Russian Football Veterans Union.

Honours
 Soviet Top League winner: 1979.
 Soviet Cup winner: 1975.

International career
Mirzoyan made his debut for USSR on 21 November 1979, in a friendly against West Germany. He played in one 1982 FIFA World Cup qualifier.

References
 Official Homepage
 Profile at RussiaTeam website 
 Profile at Dasaev 50 Jubilee Match website
 

1951 births
Living people
Footballers from Baku
Armenian footballers
Soviet footballers
Azerbaijani footballers
Soviet Union international footballers
Soviet Top League players
FC Ararat Yerevan players
FC Spartak Moscow players
Soviet football managers
FC Lokomotiv Nizhny Novgorod managers
Ethnic Armenian sportspeople
Association football defenders
Neftçi PFK players
Soviet Armenians